The immigration sign was a California highway safety sign warning motorists to avoid undocumented immigrants darting across the road. It depicted a man, woman, and girl with pigtails running. Eventually the signs became obsolete after Caltrans erected fences in the freeway's median, and the Border Patrol implemented Operation Gatekeeper in 1995, forcing illegal immigration attempts further east. No longer needing to replace them after they became dilapidated, the last immigration sign disappeared by 2018. The sign remains a pop culture icon.

History
Immigrant smugglers adopted the tactic of dropping off their human cargo on the shoulder or median of the freeway prior to passing through the checkpoint. Once past the checkpoint, the smugglers would wait for the immigrants to rejoin before proceeding to the final destination. However, in order to avoid the checkpoint (straddling the northbound lanes of the freeway), the immigrants would have to cross the freeway to the southbound shoulder. At the Camp Pendleton checkpoint, immigrants were precluded from passing the checkpoint on the northbound shoulder by rugged terrain and random Marine patrols. The running family silhouette supplemented all-text signs advising drivers "".

The running family silhouette signs were erected starting in September 1990, and it is not known how effective they were in reducing traffic strike fatalities before the implementation of other physical measures. A total of 10 were installed. Eventually, Caltrans built a tall fence in the I-5 median south of the San Clemente checkpoint, which effectively precluded the checkpoint-avoidance traffic-crossing tactic at Camp Pendleton, and the Border Patrol implemented Operation Gatekeeper in 1995, which erected a tall fence along the San Diego–Tijuana border, moving illegal immigration attempts further east into the desert.

As of 2008 and later confirmed in July 2017, one sign remained in California, and there were no plans to replace it if it became dilapidated, as it was largely obsolete. The number of people apprehended while illegally crossing the border in the region had seen a 95% decline over thirty years, going from 628,000 arrested in 1986 to 31,891 in 2016. By February 2018, the last sign had disappeared. It was located alongside Interstate 5 near San Ysidro.

Design and reuse
Caltrans graphic artist John Hood, a Navajo Vietnam War veteran, created the image as an assignment in response to the sharp rise in immigrant traffic deaths. The image was developed to elicit immediate recognition of the potential traffic hazard and to illustrate the potential running motion with the little girl's flowing pigtails. The final design process took approximately a week, and Hood drew inspiration from both his experiences in Vietnam as well as stories from his Navajo parents. Hood has stated the man's profile is similar to Cesar Chavez, and the child was depicted as a little girl being dragged along because "little girls are dear to the heart, especially for fathers." Hood likened the immigrants' plight to the Long Walk of the Navajo to their present-day reservation in northeastern New Mexico in 1864.

Since its deployment, it has become a pop culture icon as it appeared on T-shirts and anti-immigration advertisements in various incarnations. The sign can be seen in Fast & Furious when the two main characters drive south to the Mexican border.  It was exhibited in the Smithsonian Institution's permanent exhibition on transportation, and British street artist Banksy used a modified version of the silhouette family in his Kite-2 artwork exhibited on Los Angeles-area streets in early 2011. The silhouette family is also a popular target of parody, spawning variants including ones where the family is depicted wearing caps and gowns (referencing the DREAM Act); as Joseph, Mary and Jesus; as a beer label; and one where they are wearing Pilgrim gear. In June 2018, political cartoonist Rob Rogers was fired from the Pittsburgh Post-Gazette after submitting a series of cartoons critical of President Donald Trump, one of which depicted a version of the caution sign with the trailing child being torn away by a silhouetted Trump.

References

External links
 
 
 
 
 

Illegal immigration to the United States
Road signs in the United States
American culture
Road infrastructure in California